Kondrovka is a rural locality (a selo) in Prokhorovsky District, Belgorod Oblast, Russia. The population was 191 as of 2010. There are 3 streets.

Geography 
Kondrovka is located 25 km northeast of Prokhorovka (the district's administrative centre) by road. Radkovka is the nearest rural locality.

References 

Rural localities in Prokhorovsky District